Kirey is a rural locality (a selo) in Mirabilitsky Selsoviet, Kulundinsky District, Altai Krai, Russia. The population was 265 as of 2013. There are 3 streets.

Geography 
Kirey is located 16 km southeast of Kulunda (the district's administrative centre) by road. Mirabilit is the nearest rural locality.

References 

Rural localities in Kulundinsky District